Yitzchok Sternhartz (1808–1871) was the second eldest son of Nathan of Breslov. He was born in the town of Nemyriv, Ukraine, northwest of Bratslav), where his father was a disciple of Nachman of Breslov.

Biography
Sternhartz married at the age of 15 and moved to his wife's home in Cherkasy, Ukraine. The couple divorced in 1825. He remarried in 1826, to a woman whose family was opposed to Hasidic Judaism.

Death 
Sternhartz immigrated to the Holy Land in the summer of 1868, reaching Ottoman Syria. He died in Safed in 1871.

References
Kramer, Chaim (1989). Crossing the Narrow Bridge. Appendix C: Breslov Biographies. Breslov Research Institute. .
Kramer, Chaim. Through Fire and Water: The Life of Reb Noson of Breslov. Breslov Research Institute. .

See also
Breslov (Hasidic dynasty)

1808 births
1871 deaths
Ashkenazi Jews in Ottoman Palestine
Emigrants from the Russian Empire to the Ottoman Empire
Breslov Hasidim
Ottoman Hasidim
People from Nemyriv
Ukrainian Hasidim